The 2019 Stanford Cardinal football team represented Stanford University in the 2019 NCAA Division I FBS football season. The Cardinal were led by ninth-year head coach David Shaw. They played their home games at Stanford Stadium and were members of the North Division of the Pac-12 Conference. They finished the season 4–8, 3–6 in Pac-12 play, to finish last place in the North Division. This was Stanford's worst record since 2007 and the first time that they did not earn bowl eligibility since 2008.

Previous season

In 2018, the Cardinal finished the season by defeating Pitt in the Sun Bowl. They went 9–4 (6–3 Pac-12).

Preseason

Pac-12 media day

Pac-12 media poll
In the Pac-12 preseason media poll, Stanford was voted to finish in third place in the North Division.

Position key

Recruits

Personnel

Coaching staff

Roster

Depth chart
Starters and backups.

 Projected Depth Chart 2019

True Freshman
Double Position : *

Schedule

Game summaries

Northwestern

at USC

at UCF

Oregon

at Oregon State

Washington

UCLA

Arizona

at Colorado

at Washington State

Statistics

Quarterback Davis Mills set a school record during the game, throwing for 504 yards.

California

Notre Dame

Rankings

Players drafted into the NFL

References

Stanford
Stanford Cardinal football seasons
Stanford Cardinal football